Traveller Supplement Adventure 11: Murder on Arcturus Station is a 1983 role-playing game adventure for Traveller, written by J. Andrew Keith, and published by Game Designers' Workshop.

Plot summary
Murder on Arcturus Station is a murder mystery in which any of the nine suspects or player characters could have committed the murder.

Reception
E.A. Edwards reviewed Murder on Arcturus Station in Space Gamer No. 68. Edwards commented that "For the science fiction role-players who seek a stirring experience with no danger of losing a valuable playing character, Murder is a must. The collector will purchase this because it's the 11th full adventure in GDW's Traveller series. A team of mercenary adventurers will find this adventure a pleasant respite on their next R&R. Non-Traveller SFRPGers will find Murder very compatible with other systems."

Andy Slack reviewed Traveller Adventure 11: Murder on Arcturus Station for White Dwarf #54, giving it an overall rating of 7 out of 10, and stated that "I suspect most groups will want a fight somewhere in the adventure, which should be a piece of pure detective work really. I found this adventure entertaining, and recommend it to anyone with the time to do it justice."

In a retrospective review of Murder on Arcturus Station in Black Gate, Patrick Kanouse said "Murder on Arcturus Station is an exciting, flexible, and classic adventure that can be run and enjoyed all these decades later, whether using the classic Traveller rules or more modern editions. While requiring a bit more prep work by the referee, the results are worth it."

References

Role-playing game supplements introduced in 1983
Traveller (role-playing game) adventures